Yelang, also Zangke, was an ancient political entity first described in the 3rd century BC in what is now western Guizhou province, China. It was active for over 200 years. The state is known to modern Chinese from the idiom, "Yelang thinks too highly of itself".

Name

The inhabitants of Yelang called themselves Zina. This may be source of the Sanskrit word Cīna (चीन). The English word China is derived from this Sanskrit word.

Geography

Expanse

The Yelang were believed to have been an alliance of agricultural tribes covering parts of modern-day Guizhou, Hunan, Sichuan and Yunnan.

Location
The ancient Chinese historian Sima Qian described Yelang located west of the Mimo and Dian, south of Qiongdu (in what is now southern Sichuan), and east of the nomadic Sui and Kunming. Some people have identified the seat of the kingdom as Bijie in today's Liupanshui area, in modern Guizhou province, whilst others suggest the capital moved throughout the region over time.

Culture

Subsistence
The Yelang were a primarily a confederation of agricultural farming tribes.

Appearance and dress
Yelang people wore their hair up and decorated themselves with jewellery such as bracelets and necklaces.

Material culture
Archaeologists have retrieved relics from Yelang graves including "bronze swords, U-shaped bronze hairclips, turquoise bracelets and jade necklaces", as well as "various bronze, porcelain and stone vessels visibly different from those belonging to other cultures studied in China, like the Han, Dian and Bashu cultures".

Burial rites
Tomb excavations show a unique burial custom in some Yelang tombs, in which the head of the deceased is placed into a bronze pot.  This custom is unknown elsewhere in China.

Military
According to Chinese records the Yelang had strong armies.

Government
In 2007 a Miao man publicly disclosed his possession of an ancient seal, said to be that of the Yelang kingdom, and claimed to be the 75th descendant of the King of Yelang.

Political relations

Nanyue
Yelang had a close relationship with the Nanyue ("Southern Yue") kingdom and used the Zangke River (now known as the Beipan River) as a means of international transportation. The kingdom of Yelang declared their allegiance to Nanyue rule from the start of 183 BC until the end of 111 BC.

The Yi people may be modern-day descendants of the Yelang kingdom.

In Chinese culture
Yelang is best known to modern Chinese because of an incident said to have occurred in the 120s BC. According to the story the king of Yelang, convinced that his kingdom was the greatest in all the world, inquired rhetorically of the Han emperor's envoy, "Which is greater, Yelang or Han?" This gave rise to the Chinese idiom, "Yelang thinks too highly of itself". Other sources suggest that Yelang's king was simply copying an earlier statement by a ruler of the adjacent Kingdom of Dian.

Other Chinese sources describe the Yelang people as possessing supernatural powers.

See also
Pole worship
Zhuge Liang's Southern Campaign

References

1st-century BC establishments in China
Ancient peoples of China
Former countries in Chinese history
History of Guizhou